The  Explorer Newspaper is a weekly newspaper in Tucson, Arizona, United States.

Its coverage area includes the towns of Oro Valley and Marana and the communities of Catalina Foothills, Casas Adobes, Catalina, SaddleBrooke, Tortolita, Oracle, along with neighborhoods in the City of Tucson and Pima County.

It is the 9th largest newspaper in Arizona, with a circulation of 47,475. In 2007, it was sold to Thirteenth Street Media. It became part of 10/13 Communications, owner of the East Valley Tribune, in 2010. In April 30, it was sold to Times Media Group.

References

External links
Official site
The Explorers YouTube page

Newspapers published in Arizona
Mass media in Tucson, Arizona
Publications established in 1993
Weekly newspapers published in the United States
1993 establishments in Arizona